Benn Wolfe Levy (7 March 1900 – 7 December 1973) was a Labour Party Member of Parliament in the House of Commons (1945–1950), and a successful playwright. He was educated at Repton School and University College, Oxford and served in uniform in both World Wars.

Playwright and parliamentarian
Before entering politics, Levy was a successful playwright and screenwriter. He was the dialogue writer for Blackmail (1929); directed by Alfred Hitchcock, it was the first British sound film. Later, he wrote the adapted screenplay for James Whale's macabre horror film The Old Dark House (1932) in collaboration with R. C. Sherriff, based on the novel Benighted (1927) by J. B. Priestley. Levy directed one film, Lord Camber's Ladies (1932), which was the only film produced by Hitchcock which he did not himself direct.

Levy was first elected at the 1945 general election, for the Eton and Slough constituency, and stood down at the 1950 general election.  Politically, Levy was on the left of the Labour Party and later became an active member of the Campaign for Nuclear Disarmament. As a sympathiser with the Zionist movement, he also opposed Foreign Secretary Ernest Bevin over Bevin's policies towards Palestine and Israel.

As an MP, Levy made an unsuccessful effort to abolish theatrical censorship in Britain, and towards the end of his life, he was the principal author of a report opposing the arguments for censorship made by Lord Longford, the anti-pornography campaigner. He was married for more than 40 years to the American-born screen and stage actress Constance Cummings; the couple had one daughter and one son.

Levy's papers are held at the University of Sussex library.

Credits

Plays
Plays written by Levy:
This Woman Business (1925)
Mud and Treacle (1928)
A Man with Red Hair (1928)
Mrs Moonlight (1928)
Art and Mrs Bottle (1929)
Topaz (1930)
Ever Green (1930)
Springtime for Henry (1931)
Hollywood Holiday  with John van Druten (1931)
The Devil Passes (1932)
Young Madame Conti with Hubert Griffiths (1936)
Madame Bovary (1937)
If I Were You (1938)
The Jealous God (1939)
Clutterbuck (1946)
 Return to Tyassi (1950)
Rape of the Belt (1957)

Selected filmography
Director
 Lord Camber's Ladies (1932) produced by Alfred Hitchcock
Screenwriter
 The Hate Ship (1929)
 The Informer (1929)
 Waterloo Bridge (1931), directed by James Whale
 Devil and the Deep (1932)
 The Old Dark House (1932), directed by James Whale
 Topaze (1933) directed by Harry d'Abbadie d'Arrast
 Unfinished Symphony (1934) directed by Anthony Asquith
 The Dictator (1935) directed by Victor Saville

References

External links 

 
Mrs. Moonlight on Lux Radio Theater: 26 June 1939
Mrs. Moonlight on Theater of Romance: 30 August 1943
 
Parliamentary Archives, Papers of Benn Wolfe Levy, MP MBE (1900–1973)

Government and politics of Slough
Labour Party (UK) MPs for English constituencies
People from Slough
1900 births
1973 deaths
UK MPs 1945–1950
Royal Air Force personnel of World War I
Royal Navy personnel of World War II
People educated at Repton School
Alumni of University College, Oxford
British dramatists and playwrights
Jewish British politicians